Francis Conway may refer to:

 Francis Seymour-Conway, 1st Baron Conway (1679–1732), Member of Parliament for Bramber
 Francis Seymour-Conway, 1st Marquess of Hertford (1718–1794), Lord Lieutenant of Ireland and Lord Chamberlain
 Francis Ingram-Seymour-Conway, 2nd Marquess of Hertford (1743–1822), Chief Secretary for Ireland and Lord Chamberlain
 Francis Seymour-Conway, 3rd Marquess of Hertford (1777–1842), Vice-Chamberlain of the Household
 Francis Conway, plantation owner for whom Port Conway, Virginia was named

See also
 Conway Francis (1870–1924), English cricketer